Cortinarius bellus is a basidiomycete fungus of the genus Cortinarius native to New Zealand, where it grows under Nothofagus and produces purple mushrooms that can grow in fairy rings.

See also
List of Cortinarius species

References

External links

bellus
Fungi of New Zealand
Fungi described in 1990
Taxa named by Egon Horak